Man-Child is the fifteenth studio album by jazz pianist Herbie Hancock. The record was released on August 22, 1975 by Columbia Records. It was the final studio album to feature The Headhunters, and a number of guest musicians including saxophonist Wayne Shorter, a full brass section, three different guitarists (including DeWayne McKnight), and Stevie Wonder on harmonica.

Overview
It is arguably one of his most funk-influenced albums and it represents his further departure from the "spacey, higher atmosphere jazz," as he referred to it, of his earlier career. Hancock uses more funk based rhythms around the hi-hat, and snare drum. The tracks are characterized by short, repeated riffs by both the rhythm section, horns accompaniment, and bass lines. Man-Child features less improvisation from the whole band and more concentrated grooves with brief solos from the horns and Hancock himself on synthesizer and Fender Rhodes piano on top of the repeated riffs. This album features the addition of electric guitar to his new sound, which he started only five years prior to this album with Fat Albert Rotunda. The guitarists featured on this album were Melvin "Wah-Wah Watson" Ragin, DeWayne "Blackbyrd" McKnight and David T. Walker. Their extensive use of wah-wah pedal and accenting chords on the up-beat rather than the down-beat is what helps to give the album a distinct and funkier rhythm that is broken up by brief periods of stop-time where only the sustained chords are heard from the electric guitar with an open wah pedal.  The riffs are fast-paced and energetic with repeating patterns that combine with multiple voices (i.e. horns, piano, bass, synthesizer, guitar and drums and percussion). The horn section in "Hang Up Your Hang-Ups" plays repeated riffs in unison that alternate with and are answered by electric piano, synthesizer, and electric guitar in brief periods of call and response.

Paul Jackson, Bill Summers, Harvey Mason, Bennie Maupin, and Mike Clark (who replaced Harvey Mason post-1974) formed the core of the group the Headhunters with which Hancock had toured and recorded for the previous three years.  This was their final album as a group.

Track listing

Personnel
 Herbie Hancock – acoustic piano, Fender Rhodes electric piano, ARP Odyssey, ARP Pro Soloist, ARP 2600, and ARP String Ensemble synthesizers, Hohner D6 clavinet, Oberheim Polyphonic synthesizer
 Bud Brisbois – trumpet
 Jay DaVersa – trumpet
 Garnett Brown – trombone
 Dick Hyde – tuba, bass trombone
 Wayne Shorter – soprano saxophone
 Bennie Maupin – soprano and tenor saxophones, saxello, bass clarinet, bass and alto flutes
 Jim Horn – saxophones and flutes
 Ernie Watts – saxophones and flutes
 Dewayne McKnight, David T. Walker –  guitar
 Wah Wah Watson – guitar, voice bag, Maestro Universal Synthesizer System, Maestro Sample and Hold Unit
 Henry E. Davis – bass guitar
 Paul Jackson –  bass guitar
 Louis Johnson –  bass guitar
 Mike Clark – drums
 James Gadson – drums
 Harvey Mason – drums
 Stevie Wonder – harmonica
 Bill Summers – percussion

References

1975 albums
Columbia Records albums
Herbie Hancock albums
Albums produced by Dave Rubinson
Albums recorded at Wally Heider Studios